Hadsten Sports Klub Håndbold  is a handball club from Hadsten, Denmark. Currently, Hadsten SK competes in the women's Danish 1st Division. The home arena of the club is Vestjysk BANK Arena. Former female national team player Anne Dorthe Tanderup started her handball career as U8 player in Vissing-Hadsten HK and former national team player Maria Fisker has also played in the club.

Current squad
Squad for the 2022-23 season

Goalkeeper
 1  Maria Grønfeldt
 16  Marie Aas
Wingers
LW
 2  Majken Hedegaard
 2  Helena Sall
 18  Anne Sofie Grønning
RW
 31  Josefine Thorsted
 44  Cecilie Aastrup Nielsen
Pivots
 7  Lea Gulløve
 8  Kamilla Bruus

Back players
LB
 5  Cecilie Kjær Lindgaard
 15  Mathilde Pedersen
 20  Stine Kjær Schmidt
 55  Ida Callisen
CB
 25  Sofie Kessel
 29  Rebecca Sønderskov

RB
 11  Sara Jakobsen Madsen
 11  Frida Møller

Coach
 Mathias Broløs
Assistant coach
 Anders Faber

Transfers 
Transfers in the 2021-22 season.

Joining
  Marie Aas (GK) (from  IK Skovbakken)
  Maria Grønfeldt (GK) (comeback)
  Anne Sofie Grønning (LW) (from  Randers HK youth)
  Helena Sall (LW) (from  Aarhus United youth)
  Cecilie Kjær Lindgaard (LB) (from  HH Elite youth)
  Ida Callisen (LB) (from  Randers HK)
  Rebecca Sønderskov (CB) (from  SønderjyskE Håndbold)
  Cecilie Aastrup Nielsen (RW) (from  VRI)
  Lea Gulløve (P) (from  Randers HK youth)

Leaving
  Sophie Christensen Toft (GK) (Retires)
  Sarah Ernebjerg Jensen (GK) (to  Bjerringbro FH)
  Kathrine Skipper (LW) (Retires)
  Sarah Stougaard (LW) (to  Aarhus Fremad)
  Cecilie Hovgaard (LB)
  Emma Thatt (CB)
  Sofie Fynbo (CB) (to  Slagelse HK)

  Sofie Ladekjær (P) (Retires)

References

External links
 Hadsten Håndbold

Danish handball clubs
Favrskov Municipality
Handball clubs established in 2005
2005 establishments in Denmark